Melchior Küsel (1626, Augsburg – 1684, Augsburg) was a German engraver.

Life
According to Houbraken he made 24 engravings after Johann Wilhelm Baur of the Passion of Christ but also a series after Ovid.

According to the RKD, he illustrated Bibles.
He was probably the brother of the engraver Mathäus Küsel. His daughter, Johanna Sibylla, married his pupil, the engraver Johann Ulrich Kraus.

References

1626 births
1684 deaths
Engravers from Augsburg